Rich Gang is a compilation album by Young Money and Cash Money as the supergroup Rich Gang. The album was released July 23, 2013, by Young Money Entertainment, Cash Money Records and Universal Motown Records. The album contains contributions from several YMCMB members, including Birdman, Lil Wayne, Nicki Minaj, Tyga, Mack Maine, Limp Bizkit, Bow Wow, Ace Hood, Jae Millz, Cory Gunz, Gudda Gudda, Caskey, Detail, Busta Rhymes and Mystikal. The compilation also features guest appearances from artists outside the labels, including Future, Meek Mill, French Montana, T.I., Yo Gotti, Flo Rida, Chris Brown, Rick Ross, The Game, Kendrick Lamar, and R. Kelly. The album was supported by the three singles "Tapout" which peaked at No. 45 on the Billboard Hot 100, along with the R. Kelly featured "We Been On" and "50 Plates" by Rick Ross. The album received generally mixed reviews from music critics and sold 40,000 copies in the US after three weeks of sale.

Background
On February 16, 2013, Birdman released a mixtape titled Rich Gang: All Stars, in promotion of the album. It featured 24 tracks and appearances from Tyga, Jae Millz, Meek Mill, Mack Maine, Busta Rhymes and Mystikal among others. The mixtape featured various YMCMB singles such as Drake's "Started From the Bottom", Tyga's "Dope", Ace Hood's "Bugatti", Lil Wayne's "Love Me" and "Rich As Fuck".

On February 18, 2013, it was announced that Young Money Entertainment and Cash Money Records would be releasing a compilation album under the name Rich Gang, titled Rich Gang: Flashy Lifestyle on May 21, 2013. On May 5, 2013, it was announced that the album would be pushed back until June 25, 2013. In May 2013, during an interview with MTV News, Birdman said even though the project would be released on Cash Money Records, it would feature music from non-YMCMB stars as well, stating: "We have other artists like Future, who is not signed to us but a part of us. French Montana, Rick Ross, Meek Mill and all these [guys] are friends that we rock with and call on. A lot of business we do don't necessarily have to be about money, it's about relationships and this is about people that we have relationships with." On June 10, 2013, the album cover was released and it was pushed back again until July 23, 2013.

It was reported that the album would contain appearances by YMCMB members Lil Wayne, Drake, Nicki Minaj, Mack Maine, Tyga, Bow Wow, Limp Bizkit, Kevin Rudolf, Jae Millz, Gudda Gudda, Caskey, Busta Rhymes, and Mystikal. Artists outside of the record label that were reported to be working on the album included Future, French Montana, T.I., 2 Chainz and Meek Mill in June 2013. The final track list revealed additional features from Rick Ross, Chris Brown, Yo Gotti, Game, Kendrick Lamar, and R. Kelly. Notably Drake was the only artist from YMCMB announced to be on the album, yet not to appear. Birdman addressed this with MTV saying, "Drake was recording out the country and also he wants to "hold on" for the upcoming Big Tymers album.

On June 10, 2013, Cash Money Records released a press release announcing the album's release date, saying: "Without a doubt, this album is one of the best group albums to date. I guarantee that it will be in rotation on every club, at every party and coming out of the speakers of every car, " said Ronald "Slim" Williams, co-founder of Cash Money Records. Slim's brother and partner Bryan "Birdman" Williams, added, "YMCMB is a family, and this album is an example of our bond. We are thrilled to come together, partner with some of our closest friends and create something special for our fans. Think of it as an audio present, from our family, to yours."

Singles
On March 19, 2013, the first official single from the album, titled "Tapout", featuring Lil Wayne, Birdman, Mack Maine, Nicki Minaj and Future, was premiered. Minaj confirmed a music video shoot on March 11, 2013, but it was unknown for what song. Birdman confirmed on his Twitter that the video shoot was for "Tapout". The video was released on May 5, 2013 and features cameo appearances from Kimora Lee Simmons, DJ Khaled, Bow Wow, Paris Hilton and Christina Milian. The song has since peaked at No. 45 on the Billboard Hot 100.

On July 16, 2013, the second and third singles "We Been On" featuring R. Kelly, Birdman and Lil Wayne, and "50 Plates" featuring Rick Ross were released. On August 30, 2013, the music video was released for "50 Plates" featuring cameos from Birdman, Ace Hood, Caskey and Fred Durst. Then on September 3, 2013, the music video for the R. Kelly featuring "We Been On" was premiered on 106 & Park.

On March 5, 2013, the first promotional single from the album, titled "Fly Rich", featuring Stevie J, Future, Tyga, Meek Mill and Mystikal, was released. In mid-July 2013 the second promotional single "100 Favors" featuring Detail, Birdman and Kendrick Lamar was released along with the pre-order for the album on iTunes. On July 22, 2013, the music video for "Dreams Come True" featuring Yo Gotti, Ace Hood, Mack Maine and Birdman premiered on 106 & Park. On August 19, 2013, the music video was released for "Million Dollar" featuring Detail and Future. On December 12, 2013, the music video for "100 Favors" featuring Birdman, Detail and Kendrick Lamar was released.

Critical response

Rich Gang was met with mixed reviews from music critics. At Metacritic, which assigns a normalized rating out of 100 to reviews from mainstream critics, the album received an average score of 47, which indicates "mixed or average reviews" based on 6 reviews. Jon Dolan of Rolling Stone gave the album two out of five stars, saying "On this celebratory all-star compilation, Nicki and Weezy (but not Drizzy) are joined by CMYM bench contributors (Cory Gunz, Limp Bizkit, Ace Hood, Mack Maine, Tyga) and non-label heavies (Flo Rida, Rick Ross, Kendrick Lamar, R. Kelly and Chris Brown) for a crowded disc of Maybach waxing and club banging. Lamar drops a marvelously bendy verse on "100 Flavors" and hungry old-timers Mystikal and Busta Rhymes do some gonzo barking on the slippery yacht-rock jam "Everyday." Mostly, though, it's like a crowded party where you don't really get to talk to anyone as long as you'd like." Chris Dart of Exclaim! gave the album a three out of ten, saying "The scientists at Young Money/Cash Money labs deserve to be congratulated for finally managing to synthesize a safe, rap-based alternative to Ambien. At least, that's what it sounds like they were attempting when they recorded this incredibly boring "super-group" album. It features a large chunk of the YMCMB roster, but almost none of them sound like they want to be there. All the songs on Rich Gang bleed into one another; they all have the same slow-to-mid tempo, overproduced, synth-heavy beats; and almost all the rappers sleepwalk through their verses." Dan Rys of XXL gave the album an L, saying "Rich Gang is not especially lyrical, but that's not really a shocker; its strengths lie more in its hooks and club appeal, and it's fully stocked with tracks that demand to be played at ear-shattering and floor-shaking volumes. It's another all-around solid chapter in the Cash Money canon."

David Jeffries of AllMusic gave the album two and half stars out of five, saying "One begins to wonder if Rich Gang the album is simply a scrapped solo album from the label boss, one that was retooled and retitled, then hyped up to look like a Cash Money celebration piece. After all, Young Money superstar Drake is MIA, as is both the usual quality control and Cash Money sense of purpose. Fanatics only; everyone else can grab the singles." Edwin Ortiz of HipHopDX gave the album two and half stars out of five, saying "Rich Gang has its moments, but ultimately does little to establish what is truly compelling of Birdman's latest signees, as well the executive's own place in the Rap game. At best, this is a lateral move from their 2009 release We Are Young Money—which isn't a great indication that their collaborative efforts are progressing. There's no doubt that this project will have traction with some listeners, but that will based on the names involved and not the quality control (or lack thereof) presented."

Commercial performance
The album debuted at number 9 on the Billboard 200 chart, with first-week sales of 24,000 copies in the United States. In its second week the album sold 9,600 more copies. In its third week the album sold 6,400 more copies bringing its total album sales to 40,000.

Track listing
Credits adapted from the album's liner notes.

Notes
  signifies a co-producer

Personnel
Credits adapted from AllMusic.

 Ace Hood – featured artist
 J. Angel – arranger
Ronnie D. Joseph Angel – composer
Chris Athens – mastering
Inderan K. Bailey – engineer
Joshua Berkman – A&R
Birdman – featured artist
Sam Boh – mixing assistant
Bow Wow – featured artist
Chris Brown – composer, featured artist
Sean Buchanan – assistant engineer, mixing assistant
Matthew Burnett – composer, producer
Busta Rhymes – featured artist
Katina Bynum – project manager
Michael "Banger" Cadahia – engineer
Dwayne Carter – composer, executive producer
Nayvadius "Future" Cash – composer
Caskey – featured artist, composer
Yoan Chirescu – composer, guitars on "Angel"
Ariel Chobaz – engineer
John Christopher – composer
Thomas Cullison – mixing assistant
Kyle DenMead – engineer
Detail – featured artist, producer
Tramar Dillard – composer
Cory Gunz – featured artist
Fred Durst – composer
Jordan Evans – composer, producer
Noel Fisher – composer, mixing
Flo Rida – featured artist
Gary Fountaine – composer
French Montana – featured artist
Future – featured artist
Gudda Gudda – featured artist
Andrew Harr – composer
Michael Hernandez – composer
I.N.F.O – producer
Jermaine Jackson – composer
Jess Jackson – engineer
Chad Jolley – engineer
Brandon Jones – engineer
Raphaël Judrin – composer
R. Kelly – arranger, featured artist, producer, composer
Karim Kharbouch – composer
Kendrick Lamar – composer, featured artist
Ed Lidow – engineer
Lil Wayne – featured artist
Carl Lilly – composer
Limp Bizkit – featured artist
Mack Maine – featured artist
Onika Maraj – composer
Fabian Marasciullo – mixing
Antoine McColister – composer
The Mekanics – producer
Pierre-Antoine Melki – composer
Jae Millz – featured artist
Jarvis Mills – composer
Mario Mims – composer
Nicki Minaj – featured artist
Shad Moss – composer
Mystikal – featured artist
Nius – producer
Nonstop Da Hitman – producer
Peter Pankey – composer
Jermaine Preyan – composer
Andre Proctor – composer
Rich Gang – primary artist
T.I. – featured artist
William Roberts – composer
Andy Rodriguez – assistant engineer
Rick Ross – featured artist
Tyrone Staten – composer
The Runners – producer
Fareed Salamah – engineer, mixing
Matthew Samuels – composer, producer
Trevor Smith – composer
SoFLY – producer
Brian Soko – composer
Spiff TV – producer
Michael Stevenson – composer
Carlos Suarez – composer
Rich Homie Quan – featured artist
Young Thug – featured artist
Young Rich – featured artist
Tyga – featured artist
Michael Tyler – composer
Bryan "Baby Birdman" Williams – executive producer, composer
Ronald "Slim Tha Don" Williams – executive producer, mixing
 Yo Gotti – featured artist
T. Rone – featured artist

Charts

Weekly charts

Year-end charts

References

2013 compilation albums
Hip hop compilation albums
Cash Money Records compilation albums
Young Money Entertainment albums
Republic Records compilation albums
Record label compilation albums
Birdman (rapper) albums
Lil Wayne albums
Tyga albums
Busta Rhymes albums
Limp Bizkit albums
Mystikal albums
Bow Wow (rapper) albums
Ace Hood albums
Nicki Minaj albums
Kevin Rudolf albums
Albums produced by Maejor
Albums produced by Boi-1da
Albums produced by Detail (record producer)
Albums produced by Kane Beatz
Albums produced by the Runners
Albums produced by R. Kelly
Albums produced by Southside (record producer)